Kotalpur is a village and a gram panchayat in the Jangipara CD block  in the Srirampore subdivision of Hooghly district in the Indian state of West Bengal.

Geography

Location
Kotalpur is located at

Urbanisation
Srirampore subdivision is the most urbanized of the subdivisions in Hooghly district. 73.13% of the population in the subdivision is urban and 26.88% is rural. The subdivision has 6 municipalities and 34 census towns. The municipalities are: Uttarpara Kotrung Municipality, Konnagar Municipality, Serampore Municipality, Baidyabati Municipality, Rishra Municipality and Dankuni Municipality. Amongst the CD Blocks in the subdivision, Uttarapara Serampore (census towns shown in a separate map) had 76% urban population, Chanditala I 42%, Chanditala II 69% and Jangipara 7% (census towns shown in the map above). All places marked in the map are linked in the larger full screen map.

Demographics
According to the 2011 Census of India, Kotalpur had a total population of 6,948 of which 3,484 (50%) were males and 3,464 (50%) were females. Population in the age range 0–6 years was 915. The total number of literate persons in Kotalpur was 4,718 (78.20% of the population over 6 years).

Culture
David J. McCutchion mentions the Rajrajeswara temple as an at chala having terracotta panoramic battle scenes above the archway and smaller figures around the façade.

The Rajrajeswara temple (at Sr No S-WB-62) at Kotalpur is included in the List of State Protected Monuments in West Bengal by the Archaeological Survey of India.

Kotalpur picture gallery

References

External links

Villages in Hooghly district